National Route 222 is a national highway of Japan connecting Nichinan, Miyazaki and Miyakonojō, Miyazaki in Japan, with a total length of 55.2 km (34.3 mi).

References

National highways in Japan
Roads in Kagoshima Prefecture
Roads in Miyazaki Prefecture